Clásicos de la Provincia II is the twelfth album by Colombian singer/composer Carlos Vives. The album is a sequel to Vives' 1993 breakthrough album Clásicos de la Provincia and like its predecessor it is a collection of vallenato standards, updated by Carlos and his long-time backing band La Provincia.

Prior to the album's release Vives had signed a licensing deal with the supermarket company Grupo Éxito. Under the terms of the deal the album was released exclusively through stores belonging to the Éxito group on September 30, 2009, in exchange for being priced at COP$16,000, about half the normal retail price for an album. The album's low price contributed to record sales for an album in Colombia, with 42,500 copies sold on the first day of release. It sold 200,000 copies in the country, as of 2013.

Track listing
 "El Pollo Vallenato" (Luis Enrique Martínez) – 3:15 
 "Sí, Sí, Sí" (Juancho Polo Valencia) – 3:22 
 "Sin Ti" (Náfer Durán) – 3:20 
 "Las Mujeres" (Carlos Huertas) – 3:48 
 "Momentos de Amor" (Fernando Meneses) – 3:33 
 "Confidencias" (Gustavo Gutiérrez) – 3:19 
 "El Contrabandista" (Sergio Moya Molina) – 3:11 
 "Frente a Mí" (Octavio Daza) – 3:44 
 "La Parrandita" (Leandro Díaz) – 4:00 
 "La Bogotana" (Rafael Sánchez) – 3:45 
 "Mujer Conforme" (Máximo Mobil) – 4:11 
 "La Colegiala" (Rubén Darío Salcedo) – 3:34 
 "La Caja Negra" (Rafael Valencia) – 3:28 
 "La Muchachita" (Alejo Durán) – 3:05 
 "Noche sin Luceros" (Rosendo Romero) – 3:28

Personnel 
Carlos Vives - Director, Vocals, Producer, Arrangement
Egidio Cuadrado - Accordion
Mayté Montero - Gaita, Additional arrangement
Andrés Castro - Guitars, Arrangement, Producer
Luis Ángel "El Papa" Pastor - Bass, Additional arrangement
Pablo Bernal - Drums
Archie Peña - Percussion
Rodny Teran - Percussion
Carlos Ivan Medina - Piano, Keyboards, Organ, Additional arrangement
Ron Taylor - Keyboards
Alfredo Rosado - Caja Vallenata
Eder Polo - Guaracharaca
Carlos Huertas Jr. & Juan Deluque - Backing vocals
Konstantin Litvinenko - Cello
Pedro Alonso - Violin

References

2009 albums
Carlos Vives albums
Philips Records albums
Covers albums